Trstenik is a small village in the Municipality of Ormož in northeastern Slovenia. Until 2007, the area was part of the settlement of Mihalovci. The village is part of the traditional region of Styria and is included in the Drava Statistical Region.

References

External links
Trstenik on Geopedia

Populated places in the Municipality of Ormož
Populated places established in 2007
2007 establishments in Slovenia